Hindsight (Carlton LaFroyge), formerly Hindsight Lad, is a fictional superhero appearing in American comic books published by Marvel Comics. The character has appeared primarily in the New Warriors series. Created by Fabian Nicieza and Darick Robertson, he first appeared in The New Warriors Annual #3 (March 1993).

Fictional character biography
Soon after Robbie Baldwin (the superhero Speedball) moves into his building, Carlton LaFroyge discovers his secret identity. He uses this information to blackmail him. Baldwin refuses to cooperate. Soon, the New Warriors are captured by a street gang called the Poison Memories; the same gang that had viciously attacked the team's relatives, even leading to the death of Rage's beloved grandmother.

LaFroyge creates a caped costume that included automobile side mirrors attached to a football helmet. He summons the help of Night Thrasher to help free the team. Through this, he weaseled his way onto the team as a non-official member, calling himself Hindsight Lad.

Hindsight Lad became caught up in a cosmic adventure involving the New Warriors and many of their allies. In a confrontation with the Sphinx, most of the team were lost in time and space. Hindsight Lad figures out much of what is going on and assists the remaining New Warriors allies in fixing the situation.

Night Thrasher soon offers him full membership. He changes costumes to a red/yellow suit and dropped the "Lad" part of his name. Through him, another person named Timeslip gains membership. He remains with the team until sometime after issue #75.

In a lead-up to the "Civil War" storyline, Hindsight was seen following the disaster in Stamford, Connecticut wherein the Warriors during the taping of their reality TV series that inadvertently caused the supervillain Nitro to explode, killing most of the team, the villains with him and hundreds of the town's residents. LaFroyge, now retired from heroics, became unhinged at the news and turned against his former teammates, setting up an inflammatory anti-New Warriors website called DestroyAllWarriors.com. Through the site, LaFroyge publicly posted the Warrior's civilian identities and incited violence against the team's surviving members, past and present. She-Hulk helped Justice, Rage, Ultra Girl, Slapstick, and Firestar locate LaFroyge and force him to shut the site down. Then LaFroyge was arrested by She-Hulk's fiancée John Jameson.

LaFroyge is seemingly released and creates a new website (www.marvelornot.com) in order to push his conspiracy theories regarding the superhuman community. Among his theories, he believes the superhuman community to be controlled by a Cabal composed of Beta Ray Bill, Brother Voodoo, Dazzler, Lockjaw, Puck, and Deadpool.

Powers and abilities
Hindsight possesses no superhuman abilities, though Turbo (Mickey Musashi) offered to share her costume with him after her previous partner died. This was never explored. LaFroyge did have small skill with computer programming and research, as well as some tactical ability, though the latter skill was best employed when assessing events that had already occurred, analyzing in hindsight how events could have played out if different actions were taken (thus the source of his "heroic" identity). His research capabilities most often came into play as an associate and later member of the Warriors, including identifying potential additions to the Warriors' ranks when the Sphinx had dispersed the original membership throughout time.

References

Comics characters introduced in 1993
Fictional hackers
Marvel Comics superheroes